Don Biederman (February 20, 1940 – May 31, 1999) was a Canadian stock car racer from Port Credit, Ontario.

Racing career

Biederman was the first Canadian ever to campaign for a full season in the NASCAR Cup Series formerly known as the NASCAR Grand National Series.

Biederman won the prestigious Oxford 250 at Oxford Plains Speedway, Maine in 1977, one of only four Canadians to do so, with Junior Hanley, Derek Lynch, and Dave Whitlock being the others.

Biederman won the IWK 250 at Riverside International Speedway in James River, Nova Scotia on three consecutive occasions from 1979–1981.

Death and legacy

On May 31, 1999, Biederman died suddenly of a brain aneurysm at his home in Brantford, Ontario at the age of 59.

Since 2000 the OSCAAR Racing series has held a race in his honour entitled "The Don Biederman Memorial" at Flamboro Speedway in Millgrove, Ontario.

Awards

 He was posthumously inducted Canadian Motorsport Hall of Fame in 2001.
 He was posthumously enshrined on the Riverside International Speedway Wall of Fame.

Motorsports results

NASCAR
(key) (Bold – Pole position awarded by qualifying time. Italics – Pole position earned by points standings or practice time. * – Most laps led.)

Grand National Series

Daytona 500 results

References

External links
 Photo gallery at Canadian Racing Archives

1940 births
1999 deaths
Sportspeople from Mississauga
Racing drivers from Ontario
NASCAR drivers
CASCAR Super Series drivers